is a Japanese politician who became the mayor of Kobe, the capital city of Hyōgo Prefecture in Japan from 2001 until 2013. He was first elected in October 2001 and won the re-election four years later.

References 

Mayors of places in Japan
1940 births
Living people
People from Kobe
Kansai University alumni